Zealand is one of the 12 multi-member constituencies of the Folketing, the national legislature of Denmark. The constituency was established in 2007 following the public administration structural reform. It consists of the municipalities of Faxe, Greve, Guldborgsund, Holbæk, Kalundborg, Køge, Lejre, Lolland, Næstved, Odsherred, Ringsted, Roskilde, Slagelse, Solrød, Sorø, Stevns and Vordingborg. The constituency currently elects 20 of the 179 members of the Folketing using the open party-list proportional representation electoral system. At the 2022 general election it had 634,513 registered electors.

Electoral system
Zealand currently elects 20 of the 179 members of the Folketing using the open party-list proportional representation electoral system. Constituency seats are allocated using the D'Hondt method. Compensatory seats are calculated based on the national vote and are allocated using the Sainte-Laguë method, initially at the provincial level and finally at the constituency level. Only parties that reach any one of three thresholds stipulated by section 77 of the Folketing (Parliamentary) Elections Act - winning at least one constituency seat; obtaining at least the Hare quota (valid votes in province/number of constituency seats in province) in two of the three provinces; or obtaining at least 2% of the national vote - compete for compensatory seats.

Election results

Summary

(Excludes compensatory seats)

Detailed

2022
Results of the 2022 general election held on 1 November 2022:

Votes per municipality:<

The following candidates were elected:
 Constituency seats - Lars-Christian Brask (I), 3,442 votes; Astrid Carøe (F), 2,111 votes; Morten Dahlin (V), 10,385 votes; Kaare Dybvad (A), 8,891 votes; Louise Schack Elholm (V), 8,975 votes; Mette Gjerskov (A), 5,244 votes; Charlotte Bagge Hansen (M), 2,187 votes; Magnus Heunicke (A), 22,102 votes; Jacob Jensen (V), 10,169 votes; Susie Jessen (Æ), 1,195 votes; Pia Kjærsgaard (O), 6,084 votes; Brigitte Klintskov Jerkel (C), 1,965 votes; Astrid Krag (A), 7,872 votes; Rasmus Horn Langhoff (A), 4,931 votes; Jacob Mark (F), 31,235 votes; Lars Løkke Rasmussen (M), 38,439 votes; Kasper Roug (A), 6,278 votes; Peter Seier Christensen (D), 2,806 votes; Peter Skaarup (Æ), 7,341 votes; and Frederik Vad (A), 5,082 votes.
 Compensatory seats - Anne Valentina Berthelsen (F), 1,383 votes; Sascha Faxe (Å), 1,129 votes; Mike Villa Fonseca (M), 505 votes; Trine Mach (Ø), 3,937 votes; Sandra Elisabeth Skalvig (I), 854 votes; and Zenia Stampe (B), 2,836 votes.

2019
Results of the 2019 general election held on 5 June 2019:

Votes per municipality:

The following candidates were elected:
 Constituency seats - Astrid Carøe (F), 2,550 votes; René Christensen (O), 5,175 votes; Morten Dahlin (V), 9,269 votes; Lennart Damsbo-Andersen (A), 9,615 votes; Kaare Dybvad (A), 10,742 votes; Søren Espersen (O), 5,930 votes; Mette Gjerskov (A), 10,470 votes; Bertel Haarder (V), 7,736 votes; Magnus Heunicke (A), 29,062 votes; Jacob Jensen (V), 10,523 votes; Christian Juhl (Ø), 4,644 votes; Naser Khader (C), 13,579 votes; Astrid Krag (A), 34,077 votes; Marcus Knuth (V), 12,931 votes; Stén Knuth (V), 6,736 votes; Rasmus Horn Langhoff (A), 10,788 votes; Jacob Mark (F), 23,213 votes; Lars Løkke Rasmussen (V), 58,643 votes; Kasper Roug (A), 8,602 votes; and Zenia Stampe (B), 8,371 votes.
 Compensatory seats - Anne Valentina Berthelsen (F), 1,304 votes; Liselott Blixt (O), 2,427 votes; Louise Schack Elholm (V), 6,058 votes; Eva Flyvholm (Ø), 7,325 votes; Brigitte Klintskov Jerkel (C), 6,528 votes; Henrik Sass Larsen (A), 8,275 votes; Rasmus Nordqvist (Å), 1,499 votes; Kathrine Olldag (B), 1,595 votes; and Peter Seier Christensen (D), 1,850 votes.

2015
Results of the 2015 general election held on 18 June 2015:

Votes per municipality:

The following candidates were elected:
 Constituency seats - Liselott Blixt (O), 19,248 votes; Henrik Brodersen (O), 7,657 votes; René Christensen (O), 15,037 votes; Villum Christensen (I), 9,137 votes; Lennart Damsbo-Andersen (A), 9,821 votes; Kaare Dybvad (A), 7,774 votes; Søren Espersen (O), 42,873 votes; Bertel Haarder (V), 7,902 votes; Magnus Heunicke (A), 27,538 votes; Jacob Jensen (V), 8,509 votes; Christian Juhl (Ø), 4,757 votes; Astrid Krag (A), 27,520 votes; Marcus Knuth (V), 9,986 votes; Rasmus Horn Langhoff (A), 10,650 votes; Henrik Sass Larsen (A), 13,474 votes; Merete Dea Larsen (O), 10,816 votes; Jacob Mark (F), 5,820 votes; Karin Nødgaard (O), 12,542 votes; Lars Løkke Rasmussen (V), 49,265 votes; and Pernille Rosenkrantz-Theil (A), 21,121 votes.
 Compensatory seats - Louise Schack Elholm (V), 4,743 votes; Eva Flyvholm (Ø), 5,135 votes; Mette Gjerskov (A), 7,465 votes; Jeppe Jakobsen (O), 6,801 votes; Brian Mikkelsen (C), 7,044 votes; Rasmus Nordqvist (Å), 6,362 votes; and Zenia Stampe (B), 8,237 votes.

2011
Results of the 2011 general election held on 15 September 2011:

Votes per municipality:

The following candidates were elected:
 Constituency seats - René Christensen (O), 3,621 votes; Villum Christensen (I), 11,929 votes; Lennart Damsbo-Andersen (A), 12,037 votes; Louise Schack Elholm (V), 12,033 votes; Mette Gjerskov (A), 13,593 votes; Bertel Haarder (V), 27,486 votes; Ole Hækkerup (A), 13,704 votes; Magnus Heunicke (A), 17,242 votes; Henrik Høegh (V), 14,079 votes; Birthe Rønn Hornbech (V), 10,708 votes; Jacob Jensen (V), 20,289 votes; Christian Juhl (Ø), 4,131 votes; Pia Kjærsgaard (O), 68,612 votes; Astrid Krag (F), 15,125 votes; Henrik Sass Larsen (A), 17,569 votes; Brian Mikkelsen (C), 9,044 votes; Karin Nødgaard (O), 2,378 votes; Karsten Nonbo (V), 15,984 votes; Ole Sohn (F), 11,181 votes; and Zenia Stampe (B), 13,589 votes.
 Compensatory seats - Liselott Blixt (O), 2,026 votes; Rasmus Horn Langhoff (A), 11,172 votes; Flemming Damgaard Larsen (V), 9,894 votes; John Dyrby Paulsen (A), 11,278 votes; Rasmus Helveg Petersen (B), 12,780 votes; and Nikolaj Villumsen (Ø), 2,849 votes.

2007
Results of the 2007 general election held on 13 November 2007:

Votes per municipality:

The following candidates were elected:
 Constituency seats - Thomas Adelskov (A), 14,499 votes; Flemming Bonne (F), 12,222 votes; Colette Brix (O), 2,344 votes; Henrik Brodersen (O), 1,896 votes; Troels Christensen (V), 6,927 votes; Mia Falkenberg (O), 2,359 votes; Mette Gjerskov (A), 15,566 votes; Ole Hækkerup (A), 11,594 votes; Magnus Heunicke (A), 17,753 votes; Henrik Høegh (V), 11,147 votes; Birthe Rønn Hornbech (V), 12,997 votes; Jacob Jensen (V), 9,543 votes; Pia Kjærsgaard (O), 74,985 votes; Astrid Krag (F), 9,583 votes; Henrik Sass Larsen (A), 24,140 votes; Brian Mikkelsen (C), 12,404 votes; Helge Adam Møller (C), 15,780 votes; Karsten Nonbo (V), 6,919 votes; John Dyrby Paulsen (A), 11,405 votes; Anders Fogh Rasmussen (V), 83,038 votes; and Ole Sohn (F), 23,794 votes.
 Compensatory seats - Simon Emil Ammitzbøll (B), 5,363 votes; Line Barfod (Ø), 3,912 votes; Liselott Blixt (O), 1,553 votes; Lennart Damsbo-Andersen (A), 10,608 votes; Louise Schack Elholm (V), 4,222 votes; Flemming Damgaard Larsen (V), 4,296 votes; and Gitte Seeberg (Y), 10,939 votes.

References

Folketing constituencies
Folketing constituencies established in 2007
Folketing constituency